Tarasivtsi is a village in Ukraine in Chernivtsi Raion, Chernivtsi Oblast. It belongs to Vanchykivtsi rural hromada, one of the hromadas of Ukraine. The population of the village is more than 5000 people, of which 95% are ethnic Romanians and Moldovans.

Until 18 July 2020, Tarasivtsi belonged to Novoselytsia Raion. The raion was abolished in July 2020 as part of the administrative reform of Ukraine, which reduced the number of raions of Chernivtsi Oblast to three. The area of Novoselytsia Raion was split between Chernivtsi and Dnistrovskyi Raions, with Tarasivtsi being transferred to Chernivtsi Raion.

Tarasivtsi was notable as the only place in Ukraine where the Romanian language had been designated as a regional language. This occurred after Ukraine permitted regional languages to be designated in August 2012. The Constitutional Court of Ukraine on 28 February 2018 ruled this legislation unconstitutional.

Tarasivtsi (Tărăsauți) is located next to the Romanian border. The river Prut flows through the village.  The village is known for having diasporas in Italy, Portugal, France, and others.

Notable people
Anatoly Tikhai
Yakov Tikhai

References

Romanian-speaking countries and territories
Villages in Chernivtsi Raion
Khotinsky Uyezd
Populated places on the Prut